His Excellency is a 1952 British comedy drama film directed by Robert Hamer and starring Eric Portman, Cecil Parker, Helen Cherry and Susan Stephen. It follows a blunt Yorkshireman and former trade union leader, who is sent to take over as Governor of a British-ruled island in the Mediterranean. It was based on the 1950 play of the same name by Dorothy Christie and Campbell Christie. The play was also filmed for Australian television in 1958.

The film was produced at Ealing Studios under the general oversight of Michael Balcon. The sets were designed by the art director Jim Morahan. Location shooting took place in Sicily around Palermo. The film was scored by Ernest Irving who incorporated a number of themes by Handel.

Cast

Critical reception
Britmovie quoted George Perry from his book Forever Ealing, "His Excellency retains a stagebound atmosphere. Its other great fault lies in the way it wastes the theme’s potential in a glib and artificial treatment. At times the film is like an Ealing comedy that got away, with familiar stereotypes such as the ladies who form the clientele of the ‘Old Tea Shoppe’, and the governor's staff. The governor himself tends towards caricature, retaining a shirt sleeves and braces attitude akin to a trade-union rabble rouser long after he should have made a transition to the respectability demanded by his appointment... Robert Hamer returned to Ealing specially to make this film, but compared with the promise of his earlier work it is disappointing and marks the beginning of his decline."

References

External links

 His Excellency (1952), film review by Keith M. Johnston

1952 films
1952 comedy films
British comedy films
Ealing Studios films
Films directed by Robert Hamer
Films set in Europe
Films set on islands
Films set in the Mediterranean Sea
Films set in the British Empire
British black-and-white films
Films shot in Italy
British films based on plays
1950s English-language films
1950s British films